Shin-kicking, also known as shin diggings or purring, is a combat sport that involves two contestants attempting to kick each other on the shin in order to force their opponent to the ground. It has been described as an English martial art, and originated in England in the early 17th century.

History 
It was one of the most popular events at the Cotswold Olimpick Games from 1612 until the Games ended in the 1850s. When the Games were revived, in 1951, the sport was included as the World Shin-Kicking Championships and remains one of its most popular events, drawing crowds of thousands of spectators.

Shin kicking also became a popular pastime among Cornish miners. Known as clog fighting or 'purring' in the mill towns of Lancashire, it was a combative means of settling disputes popular in the later 19th century until the 1930s. Clog fighting and its associated gambling by spectators was illegal. In the late 19th and early 20th centuries, the sport was also practised by British immigrants to the United States.

Technique 

During each round, the combatants face each other and hold on to each other's collar or shoulders. Traditionally (in the Cotswold Olimpicks), they wear white coats, representing shepherds' smocks.

They typically attempt to strike their opponent's shin with the inside of the foot as well as their toes. Success in the event requires both agility and the ability to endure pain, the loser crying out "Sufficient" when he has had enough. The matches are observed by a referee, or stickler, who determines the score of the match. Modern competitions are won by the combatant who wins six out of ten against his competitor.

Legend has it that some shin-kickers wore steel-toe boots during the competitions and tried to build pain tolerance by hitting their shins with hammers. In modern competitions, the combatants are required to wear soft shoes and stuff their trouser legs with straw for padding. Ambulance crews also attend the events in case of injury.

See also
 Clog (British)
 Cotswold Olimpick Games
 Robert Dover (Cotswold Games)
 Wenlock Olympian Games

References

Bibliography
 Drayton, Michael, et al. (1636), Annalia Dubrensia: upon the yearly celebration of Mr. Robert Dovers Olimpick Games upon Cotswold-Hills, London: Robert Raworth.
 Gandy, Rob (2021), "Bold Dover", The Fortean Times, FT408, (August 2021), pp.46-50.

Combat sports
Folk wrestling styles
Sports originating in England
English culture